Apango (the municipal seat of Mártir de Cuilapán) is a town located in the Mexican state of Guerrero, approximately 35 km away from the state capital Chilpancingo.  Nearby, a ruined temple which is the sole evidence of the Coixcas can be found.

Demography
The Population and Housing count carried out in 2005 by the National Institute of Statistics, Geography and Data Processing indicated that the town had 3987 inhabitants - 1870 male and 2111 female.

Walking in honor of the Virgin of Guadalupe

Populated places in Guerrero
Municipality seats in Guerrero